Alessandro Cutrona is an American politician and attorney serving as a member of the Ohio House of Representatives from the 58th district. Cutrona was nominated to the House on May 28, 2020, succeeding Don Manning.

Early life and education 
Cutrona was born and raised in the Mahoning Valley. He graduated from Canfield High School in 2008. He earned a Bachelor of Arts degree in political science and history from Youngstown State University, followed by a Juris Doctor from the Case Western Reserve University School of Law.

Career 
Cutrona was nominated to the House on May 28, 2020, succeeding Don Manning. He is a member of the Criminal Justice, Heath, Agriculture and Rural Development Committees. Cutrona is a Republican.

Personal life 
Cutrona lives in Canfield, Ohio and is of Mexican descent.

References 

Living people
Ohio lawyers
People from Canfield, Ohio
Youngstown State University alumni
Case Western Reserve University School of Law alumni
Republican Party members of the Ohio House of Representatives
21st-century American politicians
Year of birth missing (living people)
American politicians of Mexican descent